Jan van Leyden may refer to:
 John of Leiden (1509–1536), Anabaptist leader from Leiden
 Jan van Leyden (painter), Rotterdam marine artist active 1661–1693